"Bigger on the inside" is a phrase often related to the fictional time machine and spacecraft the TARDIS.

Bigger on the inside may also refer to:

 Bigger on the Inside: Christianity and Doctor Who, a 2015 book edited by Gregory Thornbury and Ned Bustard
 Bigger on the Inside, a 2013 mixtape by More or Les
 "Bigger on the Inside", a song by Amanda Palmer on There Will Be No Intermission
 "Bigger on the Inside", a song by Aurelio Voltaire on BiTrektual
 "Bigger on the Inside", an earlier title for the Doctor Who episode "The Doctor's Wife"

See also
 Bigger (disambiguation)
 On the Inside (disambiguation)